emart is the largest retailer in South Korea. There were 160 stores across the country as of December 2016. It was founded on 12 November 1993 by Shinsegae as the first discount retailer in South Korea.

Emart is the oldest and largest discount store chain in Korea, with total sales volume exceeding US$9.4 billion in 2009. With new store openings and acquisition of Walmart Korea in 2006, Emart enjoys its retail leadership in the discount store market. Emart offers everything from food to clothes to diapers, and provides a very large variety of merchandise. Emart has a website where products can be bought or viewed online.

Emart is the first Korean retailer to open a retail store in China with the aim to become one of top leading global retailers. In January 2011, there were 27 stores in China. By February 2014, China's store count shrunk to 13 stores.

History
Emart opened its first store in Chang-dong, Dobong-gu, Seoul on November 12, 1993, and opened its first Emart Ilsan branch (No. 2) in Ilsan New Town on September 8, 1994. It was the first large retail store in South Korea. It was constructed by Kumho Engineering & Construction at the time, and when the friction between Kumho Engineering & Construction and Emart broke out, Kumho Emart became the main body of lease.

On July 7, 1995, the third Ansan branch (closed in December 2012) opened and, on December 1, 1995, the fourth Bupyeong branch (closed on June 28, 2018). On November 22, 1996, the fifth store opened in Jeju, and on November 30, 1996, the sixth store opened in Bundang. On February 1, 1997, it became the first Korean retailer to enter China and opened its seventh Emart store and first Emart store in Shanghai, China. On April 29, 1997, the company opened its eighth Namwon branch, its ninth Anyang branch on August 14, 1997, and its tenth Seobusan branch on August 29, 1997. On October 1, 2004, Emart opened an Internet shopping mall. In May 2006, Walmart acquired Walmart Korea, converting 16 Walmart stores into Emart stores. At this time, Walmart Korea was acquired and changed to Shinsegae Mart, and in 2008 it was completely merged with Emart. Since 2003, Emart has implemented a "lowest compensation system" that gives gift certificates worth 5,000 won if they are more expensive than other discount stores in the commercial area (within a radius of 5 kilometers), but abolished them on August 16, 2007, saying that some advertisements are false hype.

As of September 2009, Emart has 127 distribution centers and 4 distribution centers in South Korea, with 22 stores in the People's Republic of China. Emart stores in China also sell Korean products.

On May 13, 2011, Kim's Club Mart was acquired.

It opened in Ho Chi Minh City on 28 December 2015.

On 8 April 2016, the "Mart" experience center was opened in Busan, Kizania, and on 28 July 2016, it was opened in Ulaanbaatar.

It announced the withdrawal from China on 31 May 2017.

On May 16, 2018, Gyeongsan branch and Bupyeong branch closed due to poor performance and overlapping commercial districts with Gyeyang branch, Shizikolong Skychae will be built after demolition, and Bupyeong branch will be built in Bupyeong Jiwell. In addition, the company closed its Ulsan Hakseong Branch, Goyang Duck Branch, Incheon Branch, Gwangju Sangmu Branch, and Seobusan Branch and sold all of Costco Korea's shares to Costco's Washington headquarters.

In 2021, Emart24 convenience stores has expanded to Malaysia to directly compete with CU, in which that Emart24's first Malaysian store launched a little later at the same year.

In January 2022, Emart acquired a majority stake (80.01%) in the former eBay Korea, which it renamed "Gmarket Global". EBay retained a 19.99% stake in the company.

In December 2022, Emart24 launched in Singapore with the launch of the first two outlets on Christmas Holidays. During the launching event at Jurong Point outlet, chief executive Andy Choi has planned to launch 300 stores within the next five years.

Controversies
Food Safety
 In September 2007, the Korea Food and Drug Administration announced that chlorphenapir, a pesticide component, was detected above the standard in Emart's first water powder green tea sold under its own brand.
 On November 28, 2008, the Agricultural Quality Management Agency cracked down on Emart's Namyangju branch marking the country of origin as U.S. on the top of the meat package, but double marking as Australian was found on the barcode below.

References

External links

Official website 
Official website 
Store website 
Emart mall 
Mongolian site 
Vietnamese site
Emartmall Vietnamese site

Companies listed on the Korea Exchange
Discount stores
Retail companies established in 2011
Retail companies of South Korea
Shinsegae Group
Supermarkets of South Korea